Fairgrounds station (formerly Timonium Fairgrounds station) is a Baltimore Light Rail station located adjacent to the Maryland State Fairgrounds in Timonium, Maryland. The station has two side platforms serving two tracks.

History
The Northern Central Railway had a Timonium station near the modern location of the Fairgrounds station.

Prior to the opening of the Light Rail in 1992, the location was a park-and-ride lot with express bus service to downtown Baltimore. From 1992 until the opening of the Hunt Valley extension in 1997, the station was the northern terminus of the line. Cromwell (Yellow) service terminates at Fairgrounds during peak hours; a pocket track (at the unfinished Texas station to the north) is used to reverse trains.

References

External links

MTA Maryland - Light Rail stations

Baltimore Light Rail stations
Railway stations in the United States opened in 1992
Timonium, Maryland
Railway stations in Baltimore County, Maryland
1992 establishments in Maryland